Tarčin is a village in the municipality of Hadžići,  Bosnia and Herzegovina.

It is located around 30 km west of Sarajevo in the Sarajevo Canton within the Federation of Bosnia and Herzegovina. European route E73, a European highway between Hungary and the Adriatic Sea (Croatia) runs through Tarčin.

Demographics 
According to the 2013 census, its population was 1,113.

References

Populated places in Hadžići